YSS is Young–Simpson syndrome, a rare congenital disorder.

YSS may also refer to:
Yogoda Satsanga Society of India, a non-profit nonsectarian spiritual organization
Yorkshire Subterranean Society, a caving club
Young Scottish Socialists, the youth wing of the Scottish Socialist Party
Yengema Secondary School, Sierra Leone
Yishun Secondary School, Singapore